Luciana Sbarbati (born 10 May 1946 in Rome) is an Italian politician.

She is a substitute for the Committee on Budgets and a member of the Delegation to the EU-Romania Joint Parliamentary Committee.

Biography
Graduated in philosophy and psychology at the LUMSA in 1969, Luciana Sbarbati worked as university assistant and school principal. As member of the Italian Republican Party, she was elected parliamentary Deputy in 1992, in 1994 (into the Alliance of Progressives) and 1996 (into the Populars for Prodi).

In 1999 she was elected MEP and was re-confirmed in 2004. As MEP she was member of the Bureau of the Alliance of Liberals and Democrats for Europe and sat on the European Parliament's Committee on Civil Liberties, Justice and Home Affairs and its Committee on Petitions.

In 2001, in opposition to the PRI's decision to forge an alliance with the House of Freedoms, she left the party and founded the European Republicans Movement.

In the 2008 general election she was elected Senator among the ranks of the Democratic Party. In 2011, with the reunification of PRI and MRE, sanctioned by the PRI congress held in Rome on February 25, 26 and 27, Luciana Sbarbati returned to the PRI and its National Directorate.

Works
 Handicap e integrazione scolastica (20 anni di esperienze)
 Il messaggio morale e educativo di Antoine de Saint Exupéry 
 Adolescenti incontro alla vita
 ''L'Europa e la sfida dei nuovi diritti di cittadinanza'

References

External links
 
 

1946 births
Living people
Politicians from Rome
Democratic Party (Italy) MEPs
MEPs for Italy 2004–2009
MEPs for Italy 1999–2004
20th-century women MEPs for Italy
21st-century women MEPs for Italy
Italian Republican Party politicians
Libera Università Maria SS. Assunta alumni